is a railway station in Fukuyama, Hiroshima, Japan, operated by West Japan Railway Company (JR West).

Lines
Fukuyama Station is served by the following JR West lines.
 San'yō Shinkansen
 San'yō Main Line
 Fukuen Line

Station Layout
The Sanyo Shinkansen has 2 elevated platforms on the outer edge, with 2 tracks in the middle for trains not stopping at this station on the 3rd floor. The conventional lines have a total of 3 platforms serving 6 tracks on the ground level.

History

Fukuyama Station opened on 11 September 1891.

Surrounding area
The station was built next to the main courtyard of Fukuyama Castle. The main tower of the castle is within sight of the platforms.

Other points of note in the vicinity of the station include:
 Fukuyama University

References

External links

 Fukuyama Station information (JR West) 

Railway stations in Hiroshima Prefecture
Sanyō Main Line
Sanyō Shinkansen
Railway stations in Japan opened in 1891